The Augustine Band of Cahuilla Indians is a federally recognized Cahuilla band of Native Americans based in Coachella, California. They are one of the smallest tribal nations in the United States, consisting of only 16 members, seven of whom are adults.

Background
According to interviews with Augustine Elders in the winter of 1924–1925, the tribe is of the Nanxaiyem clan of Pass Cahuilla. Francisco Nombre, a Desert Cahuilla ceremonial leader and keeper of traditional clan genealogy, stated that the Nanxaiyem migrated to the Coachella Valley around 1860 and their survivors settled at La Mesa, the flat land east of La Quinta, California. There, according to Nombre, they became known as Augustin [sic]. There are over a dozen Pass Cahuilla clans, traditionally following patrilineal descent, and are divided into the Wildcat and Coyote moieties, inhabiting the San Gorgonio Pass eastward to Indian Wells and westward to San Timoteo Canyon. The Nanxaiyem Clan of Augustine Reservation is Coyote moiety.

On April 13, 1956, the Commissioner of Indian Affairs approved a census roll of the tribe, documenting 11 living members. Roberta Augustine, the last original enrollee, died in 1986. Thermal, California, and the Cabazon Band of Mission Indians are both nearby. The land was left vacant for half a century, until Chairman Green moved there in 1996.

Mary Ann Green, née Martin, born in 1964, decided to rebuild the tribe and resettle the reservation. On December 29, 1981, the August Band of Mission Indians was established by an Executive Order. Green was elected chairperson in 1988 and held the position until 2016. Under Green, the tribal government, which currently employs eight people, was established in 1994 and their reservation was resettled in 1996. Green's daughter, Amanda Vance, became tribal chair in 2016 after Green became ill.

Traditional Cahuilla singer, Tony Andreas, grew up on the Augustine Reservation in the 1930s and 1940s.

Current projects
The tribe has developed plans for both cultural revival and economic sustainability.

Improvements to reservation lands include adopting a zoning code and removing illegally dumped garbage. During the 50 years the land was vacant, trash, commercial wastes, carcasses, and thousands of tires were dumped on the land. The monumental cleanup task started in 1994, when the tribe partnered with the US Environmental Service, the California Conservation Corps, the California Integrated Waste Management Board, and the Riverside County Sheriff's Department.

The tribe owns the Augustine Casino in Coachella. Vance, the tribe's chair, is also the CEO of Synergy Blue, a slot machine company based in Las Vegas majority owned by the tribe. Vance and her husband also operate Temalpakh Farms, an organic vegetable farm on the grounds of the tribe.

The Augustine Band built the first photovoltaic renewable energy system on Indian land in California. The system is expected to produce 1,900 megawatts of solar energy annually.

Other Cahuilla tribes
 Agua Caliente Band of Cahuilla Indians of the Agua Caliente Indian Reservation
 Cabazon Band of Mission Indians
 Cahuilla Band of Mission Indians of the Cahuilla Reservation
 Los Coyotes Band of Cahuilla & Cupeno Indians of the Los Coyotes Reservation
 Morongo Band of Mission Indians 
 Ramona Band or Village of Cahuilla Mission Indians of California
 Santa Rosa Band of Cahuilla Indians
 Torres-Martinez Desert Cahuilla Indians

References

Further reading

External links
 Home page Augustine Band
 

Cahuilla
California Mission Indians
Native American tribes in Riverside County, California
Native American tribes in California
Federally recognized tribes in the United States